is a Japanese multinational corporation operating a department store chain carrying a wide array of products, ranging from wedding dresses and other apparel to electronics and flatware. It has more than 12 branches strategically located in 2 regions, and 4 international branches around Asia.

Takashimaya has been a member of the International Association of Department Stores from 1962 to 1997.

Takashimaya was listed at #1197 on the Forbes Global 2000 list for 2006.

Takashimaya is a member of the Sanwa Group keiretsu.

History

The first Takashimaya store was opened in Kyoto in 1831 as a sole proprietorship owned by Shinshichi Iida, a merchant from present-day Fukui Prefecture. The original store in Kyoto was only 3.6 square meters in area and specialized in selling gofuku (formal kimono). A second Kyoto store opened in 1893, followed by a Tokyo store in 1897 and an Osaka store in 1898. Takashimaya was incorporated as a gomei kaisha (unlimited liability company) in 1909 and converted to a kabushiki kaisha (stock company) in 1919.

Takashimaya began an export business in 1876, following the Meiji Restoration, and established an in-house trading unit in 1887. By 1903 Takashimaya had offices in Paris and London and an export office in Yokohama. The trading unit was spun off as a new stock company, in 1913. Takashimaya-Iida later merged with the trading company Marubeni.

The chain saw a major expansion in the early 1930s. In 1931 it opened a "10, 20 and 50 sen store" in Osaka, a predecessor of today's 100 yen store. Its flagship store in Namba, Osaka opened in 1932, and a second flagship store in Nihonbashi, Tokyo opened in 1933. The Tokyo and Osaka stores were damaged by the firebombings of Tokyo and Osaka in 1945 but were not destroyed, and served as centers for logistics during the occupation of Japan. Due to postwar regulations on the size of new stores, many Takashimaya locations opened from the 1950s onward, including its Yokohama and Yonago stores, were set up as separate companies.

In 1958, Takashimaya opened a store in New York City which eventually occupied 37,000 square feet of floor space at 693 Fifth Avenue. The New York store closed in 2010 as Takashimaya chose to refocus on East and Southeast Asian markets amid struggling sales.

In 1969, Takashimaya opened Japan's first American-style suburban shopping center near Futako-Tamagawa Station, to the southwest of Tokyo.

The Japanese department store industry went through a wave of consolidation during a revenue slump in the 2000s, with Isetan Mitsukoshi Holdings (parent of Mitsukoshi and Isetan) becoming the largest player in the industry, followed by J. Front Retailing (parent of Daimaru Matsuzakaya Department Stores). In 2008, Takashimaya announced plans to merge with H2O Retailing, the parent of the Osaka-based Hanshin Department Store and Hankyu Department Store chains, which would have formed the largest department store operator in Japan. Takashimaya and H2O entered into a cross-shareholding relationship prior to the merger, with each acquiring 10% of the other's stock, but announced the cancellation of their merger in 2010.

In 2019, the company announced it would closing its mainland China store in Shanghai on August 25, but retracted its decision after it gained support from local governments.

Stores

Directly owned
Kansai
Osaka - Nankai Building 1–5, Namba Gochome, Chuo-ku, Osaka, the north side of Nankai Railway Namba Station
Sakai - Nankai Sakaihigashi Building, 59, Mikunigaoka-Miyukidori, Sakai-ku, Sakai, near Sakaihigashi Station on the Nankai Railway Koya Line
Wakayama - the station building of Wakayamashi Station on the Nankai Railway Nankai Line, 306, Higashikuramaecho, Wakayama - scheduled to be closed in August 2014.
Semboku - Panjo, 1-3-1, Chayamadai, Minami-ku, Sakai, near Semboku Rapid Railway Izumi-Chuo Station
Kyoto - 52, Shincho, Shijo-dori Kawaramachi Nishi-hairu, Shimogyo-ku, Kyoto (Kawaramachi Station on the Hankyu Railway Kyoto Line is connected underground.)
Rakusai - Rakuseine, 5-5, Oharano Higashi-Sakaidanicho Nichome, Nishikyo-ku, Kyoto, near Rakusai Bus Terminal (Kyoto Municipal Bus, Keihan Kyoto Kotsu, Hankyu Bus)
Kanto
Nihombashi - 4–1, Nihombashi 2-chome, Chuo, Tokyo, the historical structure selected by Tokyo Metropolitan Government, near Nihombashi Station (Tokyo Metro, Toei Subway)
Shinjuku - Shinjuku Takashimaya Times Square, 24–2, Sendagaya Gochome, Shibuya, connected with the South Gate of JR East Shinjuku Station and with Shinjuku-sanchome Station on the Tokyo Metro Fukutoshin Line.
Tamagawa - the core tenant of Tamagawa Takashimaya Shopping Center in 17–1, Tamagawa Sanchome, Setagaya, near Tokyu Futako-Tamagawa Station
Tachikawa - Faret Tachikawa, 39–3, Akebonocho Nichome, Tachikawa, near Tama Monorail Tachikawa-Kita Station
Yokohama - Takashimaya Building, Sotetsu Joinus in the same location as Yokohama Station on the Sotetsu Main Line, 6-31, Minami-saiwai Itchome, Nishi-ku, Yokohama
Konandai - Konandai Birds, 1–3, Konandai Sanchome, Konan-ku, Yokohama, near Konandai Station on the JR East Negishi Line
Takashimaya Food Maison Shin-Yokohama - Cubic Plaza Shin-Yokohama, Kohoku-ku, Yokohama, near Shin-Yokohama Station on the JR Central Tokaido Shinkansen, the JR East Yokohama Line and the Yokohama Subway Blue Line
Omiya - 32, Daimoncho Itchome, Omiya-ku, Saitama the east side of Omiya Station (JR East, Saitama New Urban Transit, Tobu Railway)
Kashiwa - Takashimaya Station Mall, 3–16, Suehirocho, Kashiwa, Chiba the West side of Kashiwa Station (JR East, Tobu Railway)
Takashimaya Food Maison Otakanomori - Nagareyama-Otakanomori Shopping Center, in Nagareyama, near Nagareyama-ōtakanomori Station (Tsukuba Express, Tobu Railway Noda Line)

Subsidiaries
Takasaki Takashimaya - 45, Asahicho, Takasaki, the west of Takasaki Station (JR East, Joshin Railway)
Gifu Takashimaya - 25, Hinodecho Nichome (Yanagase), Gifu
Okayama Takashimaya - 6-40, Hommachi, Kita-ku, Okayama, near JR West Okayama Station
Yonago Takashimaya  - 30, Kakubancho Itchome, Yonago

Domestic joint venture
JR Nagoya Takashimaya - JR Central Towers, 1–4, Meieki 1-chome, Nakamura-ku, Nagoya, in the east side of JR Central Nagoya Station, joint venture with JR Central.
Iyotetsu Takashimaya - 4, Minatomachi Itchome, Matsuyama, the same location as Iyotetsu Matsuyamashi Station, joint venture with Iyo Railway Co., Ltd.

International joint-ventures 

Takashimaya Singapore - 391 Orchard Road, Singapore, joint venture with Ngee Ann Kongsi  agreed upon in 1988, store located inside Ngee Ann City.
Shanghai Takashimaya - 1438, Hongqiao Road, Changning District, Shanghai, China.
Takashimaya Vietnam - 65 Le Loi Boulevard, Saigon Centre Planning Area, Ho Chi Minh City, joint venture with Keppel Corporation, store located inside Saigon Centre.
Siam Takashimaya - 299 Charoen Nakhon Road, Bangkok, Thailand, joint venture with Siam Piwat. Two stores are located inside Iconsiam shopping mall and Siam Premium Outlet Bangkok in Samut Prakan provinces.

Former international stores/joint-ventures 

 Dayeh Takashimaya - Tianmu, Taipei, Taiwan, joint venture between Dayeh Group and Takashimaya. Takashimaya reported had sold its 50% stake, thus Dayeh Takashimaya was not mentioned in their corporate website, stating that Takashimaya are no longer affiliated with the joint-venture. Until today, the store is still operating independently using the 'Takashimaya' brand.

See also

 List of companies of Japan
 List of department stores

References

External links

Official website (in Japanese)

1830s establishments in Japan
Companies based in Kyoto
Companies based in Osaka Prefecture
Retail companies established in 1831
Department stores of Japan
Department stores of Singapore
Department stores of Taiwan
Department stores of Thailand
Food halls
Japanese brands
Japanese Imperial Warrant holders
Shopping malls in Ho Chi Minh City
Midori-kai
Companies listed on the Tokyo Stock Exchange